Reinertsen is a surname. Notable people with the surname include:

Emma May Alexander Reinertsen (1853–1920), American writer, social reformer
Espen Reinertsen (born 1979), Norwegian saxophonist, flutist, composer, and music producer
Jon Reinertsen (born 1946), Norwegian handball player
Sarah Reinertsen (born 1975), American paratriathlete 
Stein Reinertsen (born 1960), Norwegian Lutheran bishop
Terje Reinertsen (born 1987), Norwegian footballer
Trond Reinertsen (born 1945), Norwegian economist and businessman

Surnames from given names